Aristebulea principis is a moth in the family Crambidae. It was described by Eugene G. Munroe and Akira Mutuura in 1968. It is found in Fujian, China.

References

Moths described in 1968
Spilomelinae
Moths of Asia